Reiter is a German surname. The surname is relatively frequent in Germany, and in most cases is locational, derived from places called Reit or Reith (with an original meaning of "clearing"). A variant of the same name is Reuter.
In some cases the name may also be occupational, derived from Reitherr, the office of treasurer in Upper German towns, or from makers of winnowing sieves (Reiter), or from the term Reiter "horseman, cavalryman, curassier".

People with the surname include:
 Yonatan Reiter (born 1998), Israeli professional soccer player and Computer scientist
 Charlie Reiter (born 1988), American professional association footballer
 Dieter Reiter, Mayor of Munich
 Elizabeth Reiter, American operatic soprano 
 Ernst Reiter, German biathlete
 Hans Reiter (disambiguation), several people
 Jeannot Reiter, former Luxembourg international footballer
 Josef Reiter (composer), Austrian composer
 Josef Reiter (judoka), Austrian judoka
 Justin Reiter, American snowboarder
 Ľubomír Reiter, Slovak footballer
 Madelyn Reiter (1942-2020), American politician
 Mario Reiter, Austrian alpine skier
 Mario Reiter (footballer), Austrian footballer
 Michael K. Reiter, American computer scientist
 Michael Reiter (police officer), American security advisor and former police chief
 Paul Reiter, a professor of medical entomology at the Pasteur Institute in Paris, France
 Philipp Reiter (b. 1991), German ski mountaineer and mountain runner
 Raymond Reiter, computer scientist
 Thomas Reiter, German astronaut
 William J. Reiter (1889–1979), American assistant director

References

German-language surnames
Jewish surnames
Yiddish-language surnames